The Guyana Defence Force Ground is a multi-use stadium on Vlissengen Road in Georgetown, Guyana. 

Owned by the Guyana Defence Force and based within Camp Ayanganna, it is used mostly for football matches and athletics competitions, though in the past it has hosted one first-class cricket match. This match was the final of the Guystac Trophy between Demerara and Berbice in October 1987. The match saw both Rudolph Doodnauth of Berbice and Clyde Butts of Demerara take five wicket hauls, with the match ending in a draw. With a capacity of 2,000, the ground is used by the Defence Force as their home ground.

See also
List of cricket grounds in the West Indies

References

External links
Guyana Defence Force Ground at ESPNcricinfo

Athletics (track and field) venues in Guyana
Cricket grounds in Guyana
Football venues in Georgetown, Guyana